Podsludnoye is a rural locality (a selo) in Yayvinskoye Urban Settlement, Alexandrovsky District, Perm Krai, Russia. The population was 14 as of 2010.

Geography 
Podsludnoye is located on the Yayva River, 41 km northwest of Alexandrovsk (the district's administrative centre) by road. Nizhnyaya is the nearest rural locality.

References 

Rural localities in Alexandrovsky District